New Jersey's 2nd congressional district, based in Southern New Jersey, is represented by Republican  Jeff Van Drew. He was first elected as a Democrat in 2018, but announced on December 19, 2019, that he would be switching parties. The district, which is New Jersey's largest geographically, is a Republican-leaning seat that has shifted to the right since the late 2010s.

Demographics 

According to the APM Research Lab's Voter Profile Tools (featuring the U.S. Census Bureau's 2019 American Community Survey), the district contained about 528,000 potential voters (citizens, age 18+). Of these, 72% are White, 13% Black, and 11% Latino. Immigrants make up 7% of the district's potential voters. Median income among households (with one or more potential voter) in the district is about $68,127, while 9% of households live below the poverty line. As for the educational attainment of potential voters in the district, 10% of those 25 and older have not earned a high school degree, while 27% hold a bachelor's or higher degree.

Counties and municipalities in the district
For the 118th and successive Congresses (based on redistricting following the 2020 Census), the district contains all or portions of six counties and 93 municipalities.

Atlantic County (23):
all 23 municipalities

Cape May County (16):
all 16 municipalities

Cumberland County (14):
all 14 municipalities

Gloucester County (11):
Clayton, East Greenwich Township (part; also 1st), Elk Township, Franklin Township, Greenwich Township, Harrison Township, Logan Township, Newfield, South Harrison Township, Swedesboro and Woolwich Township

Ocean County (14):
Barnegat, Barnegat Light, Beach Haven, Berkeley Township (part; also 4th), Eagleswood, Harvey Cedars, Lacey (part; also 4th), Little Egg Harbor Township, Long Beach Township, Ocean Township, Ship Bottom, Stafford Township, Surf City, Tuckerton

Salem County (15):
all 15 municipalities

Recent results from statewide elections 
Results Under Current Lines (Since 2023)

Results Under Old Lines

List of members representing the district 
District organized in 1799.

1799–1801: One seat 

1813–1815: Two seats

1843–present: One seat

Recent electoral history 
Results 1844–2022

References

 Congressional Biographical Directory of the United States 1774–present

Further reading
 

02
Atlantic County, New Jersey
Burlington County, New Jersey
Camden County, New Jersey
Cape May County, New Jersey
Cumberland County, New Jersey
Gloucester County, New Jersey
Salem County, New Jersey
Constituencies established in 1799
1799 establishments in New Jersey
Constituencies disestablished in 1801
1801 disestablishments in New Jersey
Constituencies established in 1813
1813 establishments in New Jersey
Constituencies disestablished in 1815
1815 disestablishments in New Jersey
Constituencies established in 1843
1843 establishments in New Jersey